The World as Best as I Remember It is a two-volume album series by songwriter Rich Mullins. The first volume was released in 1991 on Reunion Records and the second was released in 1992. The first volume was listed at No. 7 in CCM Magazines The 100 Greatest Albums in Christian Music.

The song in the first volume, "Step by Step," written by Beaker, became a popular contemporary worship song among Christians. Mullins added new verses to the song for the second volume.

Volume One

Track listing
 "Step By Step" (Beaker) – 2:39
Appeared on compilation Songs 2 1999
 "Boy Like Me/Man Like You" (Rich Mullins, Beaker) – 3:17
Appeared on compilation Songs 1996
 "Where You Are" (Rich Mullins, Beaker) – 3:07
Appeared on compilation Songs 2 1999
 "Jacob and 2 Women" (Rich Mullins) – 3:03
 "The Howling" (Rich Mullins, Beaker) – 3:21
 "Calling Out Your Name" (Rich Mullins) – 4:51
Appeared on compilation Songs 1996
 "Who God is Gonna Use"  (Rich Mullins) – 3:10
 "The River" (Rich Mullins) – 4:48
 "I See You" (Rich Mullins) – 5:27
Appeared on compilation Songs 2 1999
 "Step By Step (reprise)"  (Beaker) – 2:22

Charts

Personnel 
 Rich Mullins – lead vocals, acoustic piano (1, 5, 10), lap dulcimer (3, 7), hammered dulcimer (6)
 Reed Arvin – string arrangements (1, 6, 8, 9, 10), acoustic piano (3, 4, 8), keyboards (3, 6, 9), strings (3), Synclavier (4, 9)
 Billy Crockett – guitars (2)
 Jerry McPherson – guitars (3, 8, 9), electric guitar (5)
 Tom Hemby – mandolin (4), acoustic guitar (5)
 Gary Lunn – bass (2, 3, 5, 8)
 Tommy Sims – bass (7, 9, 10)
 Steve Brewster – drums (2, 5, 7)
 Paul Leim – drums (3, 8, 9)
 Eric Darken – percussion (6)
 Steve Snoddy – bagpipes (1)
 Sam Levine – recorder (2)
 Steven V. Taylor – choir arrangements (1), vocal arrangements (5)
 Tommy Gardner – boy soprano (1, 9, 10)
 Chris Rodriguez – backing vocals (2, 3, 7)
 Susan Ashton – backing vocals (3)
 Bonnie Keen – backing vocals (3)
 Vicki Hampton – backing vocals (7)
 Donna McElroy – backing vocals (7)
The Little Choir (Tracks 1, 5 & 9)
 Lisa Bevill-Amann, Chris Harris, Lisa Glasgow, Gary Janney, Tammy Jensen, Guy Penrod, Gary Robinson, Leah Taylor, Steven V. Taylor and Tricia Walker 
The Big Choir (Tracks 9 & 10)
 Bev Bartsch, Michael P. Bodkin, Dane Brashear, Michele Buc, John Colton, Alfredo Coleman, Mark Comden, Don Donahue, Karen Franz, Alison Freemon, David Hamilton, Angela Hewitt, Joe Hicks, Michelle Hicks, Andy Ivey, Elizabeth Leighton Jones, Lori Lee Loving, Robert Magee, Marita Meinerts, Michael Nolan, Danny O'Lannerghty, Laurie Omahundro, Tony Peterson, Kristin Pierson, Matt Pierson, Bernie Sheahan, Bill Sinclair, Leslie Tarkington and Kevin Wolf 

Production notes
 Produced by Reed Arvin
 Executive Producers – Michael Blanton and Don Donahue
 Engineered by Reed Arvin, Ronnie Brookshire, Bill Deaton, Lynn Fuston, Brent King, Penn Singleton and Rick Will.
 Second Engineers – Patrick Kelly, Doug Wildeboer and Shane Wilson.
 Mixed by Rick Will at The Castle (Franklin, Tennessee).
 Recorded at Casa de Pepe Music, OmniSound Recording Studio and Hummingbird Recording.
 Art Direction by D. Rhodes and Buddy Jackson
 Photography by Mark Tucker
 Design by Buddy Jackson for Jackson Design.

Volume Two

Track listing
 "Hello Old Friends" (Rich Mullins) – 2:10
 "Sometimes By Step" (Rich Mullins and Beaker) – 4:53
Appeared on compilation Songs 1996
 "Everyman" (Rich Mullins and Beaker) – 5:25
 "The Just Shall Live" (Rich Mullins) – 4:03
Appeared on compilation Songs 2 1999
 "Waiting" (Rich Mullins and Beaker) – 3:53
 "To Tell Them" (Rich Mullins) – 3:45
 "The Maker of Noses"  (Rich Mullins and Beaker) – 4:55
 "What Susan Said"  (Rich Mullins) – 3:17
 "Growing Young"  (Rich Mullins and Beaker) – 4:19
Appeared on compilation Songs 2 1999
 "All The Way My Savior Leads Me"  (Words by Fanny Crosby, Music by Robert Lowery, arranged by Rich Mullins) – 2:33
 "Sometimes By Step" (Reprise) (Rich Mullins and Beaker) – 2:35

Charts

Personnel 
 Rich Mullins – lead vocals, hammered dulcimer (2, 11), arrangements (10)
 Reed Arvin – string arrangements (1–4, 11), keyboards (2, 5, 7, 8, 11), acoustic piano (3, 4, 6, 9)
 Phil Madeira – Hammond B3 organ (4), organ (9)
 Billy Crockett – acoustic guitar (1, 8, 10)
 George Cocchini – guitar (3, 7), electric guitars (5, 8)
 Gordon Kennedy – guitar (3, 7, 9)
 Tom Hemby – guitar (4), acoustic guitar (5), mandolin (5)
 Gary Lunn – bass (2, 3, 4, 8–11)
 Steve Brewster – drums (2–5, 8, 9, 11), rototoms (6), fingersnaps (6), footstomps (6), cowbell (6), suspended cymbal (6), Culligan water bottle (6)
 Mark Hammond – drums (7)
 Eric Darken – percussion (2, 9, 11)
 John Catchings – strings (1)
 David Davidson – strings (1)
 Ted Madsen – strings (1)
 Kristin Wilkinson – strings (1), string contractor (1–4, 11)
 Mike Eldred – backing vocals (2, 11)
 Lisa Glasgow – backing vocals (2, 11)
 Stephanie Hall – backing vocals (2, 11)
 Mark Ivey – backing vocals (2, 11)
 Camille Renaldo – backing vocals (2, 11)
 Michael Sandifer – backing vocals (2, 11)
 Kevin Max – backing vocals (6)
 Will Owsley – backing vocals (6)
 Millard Powers – backing vocals (6)
 Billy Simon – backing vocals (7)

The Choir (Track 4)
 Bob Bailey, Vince Ebo, Kim Fleming, Vicki Hampton, Emily Harris, Robin Johnson, Donna McElroy, Howard Smith and Mervyn Warren 

Production notes
 Produced by Reed Arvin
 Executive Producers – Michael Blanton and Don Donahue
 Engineered by Reed Arvin, Steve Bishir, Ronnie Brookshire, Lynn Fuston, Billy Whittington and Rick Will.
 Recorded at Quad Studios, The Saltmine, Benson Studios and Sound Stage Studios.
 Mixed by Rick Will at Sound Stage Studios,  assisted by Melanie Jones.
 Mastered by Hank Williams at MasterMix (Nashville, Tennessee).
 Art Direction by D. Rhodes and Buddy Jackson
 Photography by Mark Tucker
 Design by Buddy Jackson for Jackson Design.

References

Rich Mullins albums
Album series
Albums produced by Reed Arvin